The 1964–65 NBA season was the Bullets' 4th season in the NBA and 2nd season in the city of Baltimore.

Roster

Regular season

Season standings

x – clinched playoff spot

Record vs. opponents

Game log

Playoffs

|- align="center" bgcolor="#ccffcc"
| 1
| March 24
| @ St. Louis
| W 108–105
| Bailey Howell (25)
| Walt Bellamy (20)
| three players tied (4)
| Kiel Auditorium5,320
| 1–0
|- align="center" bgcolor="#ffcccc"
| 2
| March 26
| @ St. Louis
| L 105–129
| Don Ohl (23)
| Walt Bellamy (12)
| Gus Johnson (7)
| Kiel Auditorium7,628
| 1–1
|- align="center" bgcolor="#ccffcc"
| 3
| March 27
| St. Louis
| W 131–99
| Bellamy, Ohl (23)
| Walt Bellamy (18)
| Johnson, Green (3)
| Baltimore Civic Center6,358
| 2–1
|- align="center" bgcolor="#ccffcc"
| 4
| March 30
| St. Louis
| W 109–103
| Kevin Loughery (31)
| Walt Bellamy (10)
| Kevin Loughery (6)
| Baltimore Civic Center6,423
| 3–1
|-

|- align="center" bgcolor="#ffcccc"
| 1
| April 3
| @ Los Angeles
| L 115–121
| Don Ohl (29)
| Bailey Howell (20)
| Walt Bellamy (5)
| Los Angeles Memorial Sports Arena14,579
| 0–1
|- align="center" bgcolor="#ffcccc"
| 2
| April 5
| @ Los Angeles
| L 115–118
| Don Ohl (30)
| Walt Bellamy (20)
| Johnson, Bellamy (5)
| Los Angeles Memorial Sports Arena10,594
| 0–2
|- align="center" bgcolor="#ccffcc"
| 3
| April 7
| Los Angeles
| W 122–115
| Bailey Howell (29)
| Bailey Howell (17)
| Johnson, Loughery (4)
| Baltimore Civic Center7,247
| 1–2
|- align="center" bgcolor="#ccffcc"
| 4
| April 9
| Los Angeles
| W 114–112
| Don Ohl (28)
| Walt Bellamy (16)
| four players tied (3)
| Baltimore Civic Center10,642
| 2–2
|- align="center" bgcolor="#ffcccc"
| 5
| April 11
| @ Los Angeles
| L 112–120
| Walt Bellamy (29)
| Gus Johnson (16)
| Bellamy, Howell (5)
| Los Angeles Memorial Sports Arena15,013
| 2–3
|- align="center" bgcolor="#ffcccc"
| 6
| April 13
| Los Angeles
| L 115–117
| Don Ohl (34)
| Walt Bellamy (15)
| Walt Bellamy (5)
| Baltimore Civic Center8,590
| 2–4
|-

Awards and records
Gus Johnson, All-NBA Second Team
Wali Jones, NBA All-Rookie Team 1st Team

References

Washington Wizards seasons
Baltimore
Baltimore Bullets
Baltimore Bullets